Marinkovci is a village in the municipality of Bosansko Grahovo, Canton 10 of the Federation of Bosnia and Herzegovina, an entity of Bosnia and Herzegovina.

Demographics 

According to the 2013 census, its population was 53, all Serbs.

Footnotes

Bibliography 

 

Populated places in Bosansko Grahovo
Serb communities in the Federation of Bosnia and Herzegovina